Gerrit Jacobus Korteweg (born 17 August 1937) is a retired Dutch swimmer. He competed at the 1960 Summer Olympics in and 4×100 m medley relay and finished eighth in the latter event. In the 200 m butterfly, he finished sixth.

References

1937 births
Living people
Dutch male butterfly swimmers
Swimmers at the 1960 Summer Olympics
Olympic swimmers of the Netherlands
Sportspeople from Malang